Machilus is a genus of flowering plants in the family Lauraceae. It is found in temperate, subtropical, and tropical forest, occurring in China, Korea, Japan, Taiwan, Indochina, the Indian subcontinent, Malaysia, Indonesia, and the Philippines. It is sometimes included in the genus Persea, and currently includes about 100 species.

Description
Machilus are evergreen trees or shrubs, some species growing as much as 30 m tall. Their entire, pinnately veined leaves are alternately borne along the stems. Their bisexual flowers are borne in inflorescences that are usually paniculate, terminal, subterminal, or arising from near base of branchlets, with long peduncles or rarely without peduncles. Perianth tubes are short; perianth lobes 6 in 2 series, equal, subequal, or occasionally outer ones conspicuously smaller than inner ones, usually persistent, rarely deciduous. Fertile stamens 9 in 3 series, anthers 4-celled, 1st and 2nd series of stamens eglandular, anthers introrse, 3rd series of stamens glandular, anthers extrorse or lateral, glands stipitate to sessile. Staminodes in 4th series, sagittate. Ovary sessile; stigmas small, dish-shaped or capitate. Fruits are fleshy, globose, rarely ellipsoid or oblong, subtended at base by persistent and reflexed perianth lobes; the fruiting pedicel does not become enlarged.

Species 
The genus includes the following species:

 Machilus attenuata F.N.Wei & S.C.Tang – China (Guangxi)
 Machilus austroguizhouensis S.K. Lee & F.N. Wei – China (Guizhou and Guangxi)
 Machilus balansae (Airy Shaw) F.N. Wei & S.C. Tang – northern Vietnam
 Machilus bokorensis Yahara & Tagane – Cambodia
 Machilus bonii Lecomte – China (southeastern Yunnan, southwestern Guizhou, and western Guangxi) and Vietnam
 Machilus boninensis Koidz. – Ogasawara Islands
 Machilus breviflora (Benth.) Hemsl. – China (Guangxi, Guangdong, Hong Kong, and Hainan)
 Machilus brevipaniculata Yahara & Tagane – Cambodia
 Machilus calcicola C.J. Qi – China (northeastern Guangxi, Guangdong, and Hunan)
 Machilus cambodiana Mase, Tagane & Yahara – described from Keo Seima Wildlife Sanctuary, Cambodia
 Machilus cavaleriei H. Lév. – China (southern Guizhou and northwestern Guangxi) and Vietnam
 Machilus chayuensis S.K. Lee – southeastern Tibet
 Machilus chekiangensis S.K. Lee – China (Hong Kong, Fujian, and Zhejiang)
 Machilus chienkweiensis S.K. Lee – China (southeastern Guizhou and northern Guangxi)
 Machilus chinensis (Benth.) Hemsl. – China (Guangxi, Guangdong, and Hong Kong) and Vietnam
 Machilus chrysotricha H.W.Li – China (northwestern and central Yunnan)
 Machilus chuanchienensis S.K.Lee – China (southeastern Sichuan and northeastern Guizhou)
 Machilus cicatricosa S.K. Lee – Vietnam and Hainan
 Machilus clarkeana King ex Hook.f. – Nepal, East Himalaya, eastern India, and Myanmar
 Machilus cochinchinensis Lecomte – Laos and Vietnam
 Machilus coriacea A.Chev. – Vietnam
 Machilus curranii Merr. – Luzon
 Machilus daozhenensis Y.K. Li –  China (Daozhen in Guizhou)
 Machilus declinata (Blume) de Kok – Myanmar, Peninsular Malaysia, Sumatra, and Java
 Machilus decursinervis Chun – southern China and Vietnam
 Machilus dinganensis S.K. Lee & F.N. Wei – China (Guangdong and Hainan)
 Machilus dubia Das & P.C.Kanjilal – Bhutan, East Himalaya, and eastern India
 Machilus dumicola (W.W. Sm.) H.W. Li
 Machilus duthiei King
 Machilus edulis King ex Hook.f.
 Machilus fasciculata H.W. Li
 Machilus foonchewii S.K. Lee
 Machilus forrestii (W.W.Sm.) L.Li, J.Li & H.W.Li
 Machilus fruticosa Kurz
 Machilus fukienensis Hung T. Chang
 Machilus gamblei King ex Hook. f.
 Machilus glabrophylla J.F. Zuo
 Machilus glaucescens (Nees) Wight
 Machilus glaucifolia S.K. Lee & F.N. Wei
 Machilus gongshanensis H.W. Li
 Machilus gracillima Chun
 Machilus grandibracteata S.K. Lee & F.N. Wei
 Machilus grijsii Hance
 Machilus hemsleyi Nakai
 Machilus holadena H. Liu
 Machilus ichangensis Rehder & E.H. Wilson
 Machilus japonica Siebold & Zucc.
 Machilus kingii Hook.f.
 Machilus kobu Maxim.
 Machilus kochummenii de Kok
 Machilus konishii Hayata
 Machilus kurzii King ex Hook. f.
 Machilus kwangtungensis Yen C. Yang
 Machilus lenticellata S.K. Lee & F.N. Wei
 Machilus leptophylla Hand.-Mazz.
 Machilus lichuanensis W.C. Cheng
 Machilus listeri King ex Hook.f.
 Machilus litseifolia S.K. Lee
 Machilus lohuiensis S.K. Lee
 Machilus longipes Hung T. Chang
 Machilus mangdangshanensis Q.F. Zheng
 Machilus melanophylla H.W. Li
 Machilus miaoshanensis F.N. Wei & C.Q. Lin
 Machilus microcarpa Hemsl.
 Machilus microphylla (H.W.Li) L.Li, J.Li & H.W.Li
 Machilus minkweiensis S.K. Lee
 Machilus minutiflora (H.W.Li) L.Li, J.Li & H.W.Li
 Machilus minutiloba S.K. Lee
 Machilus montana L.Li, J.Li & H.W.Li
 Machilus monticola S.K. Lee
 Machilus multinervia H. Liu
 Machilus nakaoi S.K. Lee
 Machilus nanchuanensis N. Chao
 Machilus nanmu (Oliv.) Hemsl.
 Machilus obovatifolia (Hayata) Kaneh. & Sasaki
 Machilus obscurinervis S.K. Lee
 Machilus oculodracontis Chun
 Machilus oreophila Hance
 Machilus ovatiloba S.K. Lee
 Machilus obscurinervis S.K.Lee
 Machilus oculodracontis Chun
 Machilus odoratissima Nees
 Machilus oreophila Hance
 Machilus ovatiloba S.K.Lee
 Machilus parabreviflora Hung T. Chang
 Machilus pauhoi Kaneh.
 Machilus phoenicis Dunn
 Machilus platycarpa Chun
 Machilus pomifera (Kosterm.) S.K. Lee
 Machilus pseudokobu Koidz.
 Machilus pubescens Blume
 Machilus pyramidalis H.W. Li
 Machilus rehderi C.K. Allen
 Machilus reticulata K.M. Lan
 Machilus rimosa (Blume) Blume
 Machilus robusta W.W. Sm.
 Machilus rufipes H.W. Li
 Machilus salicina Hance
 Machilus salicoides S.K. Lee
 Machilus seimensis Mase, Tagane & Yahara – described from Keo Seima Wildlife Sanctuary, Cambodia
 Machilus sericea (Nees) Blume
 Machilus shiwandashanica Hung T. Chang
 Machilus shweliensis W.W. Sm.
 Machilus sichourensis H.W. Li
 Machilus sichuanensis N. Chao
 Machilus submultinervia Y.K. Li
 Machilus sumatrana (Kosterm.) F.N. Wei & S.C. Tang
 Machilus tenuipilis H.W. Li
 Machilus thunbergii Siebold & Zucc.
 Machilus tingzhourensis M.M. Lin, T.F. Que & S.Q. Zheng
 Machilus velutina Champ. ex Benth.
 Machilus velutinoides S.K. Lee & F.N. Wei
 Machilus verruculosa H.W. Li
 Machilus versicolora S.K. Lee & F.N. Wei
 Machilus viridis Hand.-Mazz.
 Machilus wangchiana Chun
 Machilus wenshanensis H.W. Li
 Machilus yunnanensis Lecomte
 Machilus zuihoensis Hayata

References

External links
 

Lauraceae genera